Anacardium, the cashews, are a genus of flowering plants in the family Anacardiaceae, native to tropical regions of the Americas. The best known species is Anacardium occidentale, which is commercially cultivated for its cashew nuts and cashew apples.

Etymology
The name Anacardium, originally from the Greek, actually refers to the nut, core or heart of the fruit, which is outwardly located (ana means "upwards" and -cardium means "heart").

Taxonomy
The oldest species of the genus Anacardium is Anacardium germanicum from the Eocene aged Messel Pit of Germany, well outside the current range of the genus. They were present in the Americas by the Oligocene-Miocene, as evidenced by the species Anacardium gassonii from Panama.

, the Plants of the World Online accepts 20 species:
Anacardium amapaense J.D.Mitch.
Anacardium amilcarianum Machado
Anacardium brasiliense Barb.Rodr. 
Anacardium caracolii Mutis ex Alba
Anacardium corymbosum Barb.Rodr.
Anacardium curatellifolium A.St.-Hil.
Anacardium excelsum L. — Wild cashew
Anacardium fruticosum J.Mitch. & S.A.Mori
Anacardium giganteum (Bertero & Balb. ex Kunth) Skeels — Caja acu, also known as wild cashew, used medicinally
Anacardium humile Hance ex Engl.
Anacardium kuhlmannianum Machado
Anacardium microsepalum <Loes.
Anacardium nanum A.St.-Hil.
Anacardium negrense Pires & Froes
Anacardium occidentale L. — Cashew
Anacardium othonianum Rizzini
Anacardium parvifolium Ducke
Anacardium rondonianum Machado
Anacardium spruceanum Benth. ex Engl. 
Anacardium tenuifolium Ducke

References

External links

 
Anacardiaceae genera